SMS M68 was a M1916 type minesweeper built for the Imperial German Navy during the First World War. She entered service on 6 October 1917, but was mined and sunk off Latvia on 29 October 1917. The ship was salvaged by Latvia and entered service with the Latvian Navy on 10 November 1921 under the name Virsaitis as its first vessel. She was taken over by the Soviet Navy in August 1940 when the Soviet Union occupied Latvia in August 1940, serving as T-297 and was sunk by a mine on 2 December 1941.

Design and construction
The M1916 Type minesweeper was an improved and slightly enlarged derivative of the M1914 and M1915 Type minesweepers which Germany had built since 1914. They were fleet minesweepers, seaworthy enough to operate in the open sea, and proved to be successful and reliable in service.

As built, M68 had a main gun armament of two 8.8 cm (3.5 in) SK L/45 naval guns, while 30 mines could be carried. Armament in Latvian service was listed as two  Canet guns and one 2-pounder (40 mm) gun in 1931. In Soviet service, the ship was armed with two 76.2 mm (3 inch) guns and two 45 mm guns, backed up by four 7.62 mm machine guns, and was rearmed in September 1941 with three 102 mm (4 inch) and two 37 mm guns, backed up with two 12.7 mm machine guns. The ship had a crew of 40 in German service, with a crew of 69 in Latvia service, and 66 in Soviet service.

M68 was laid down early in 1917 at A. G. Neptun's shipyard in Rostock as yard number 382, was launched on 25 July 1917 and was commissioned on 6 October 1917.

Service

Germany
M68 joined the 3rd Minesweeping half-flotilla of the 2nd Minesweeping Flotilla, operating in the Baltic. Her service with the Imperial German Navy was short, however, as she was sunk after striking a mine off Riga on 29 October 1917.

Latvia
In 1918, M68 was raised and taken to Riga for repair, but in January 1919 was seized by the forces of the Latvian Socialist Soviet Republic as they gained control of most of the country during the Latvian War of Independence. In May 1919, M68 changed hands again when Riga was captured by German Freikorps, and in July control of Riga passed back to the forces of the Latvian Provisional Government. With repairs complete, the ship was commissioned into the Latvian Navy as Virsaitis on 10 November 1921, serving as a guardship.

In October 1939, Latvia was pressured into signing a Mutual Assistance Treaty with the Soviet Union, permitting the Soviets to base troops on Latvian territory, and in June 1940 the Soviet Union occupied Latvia, with Latvia formally being incorporated into the Soviet Union on 3 August 1940. As a result, the Latvian armed forces, including its Navy, became part of the Soviet armed forces.

Soviet Navy
As part of this process, Virsaitis joined the Soviet Baltic Fleet on 19 August 1940 as a minesweeper, and was renamed T-297. Germany invaded the Soviet Union on 22 June 1941. T-297, which was redesignated as an escort vessel on 25 July 1941 (returning to the name Virsaitis), was used to defend naval bases and communication routes. From 31 October 1941, the Baltic Fleet carried out a series of convoy operations to evacuate the garrison of the Hanko Peninsula, which the Finns had been forced to lease to the Soviets for use as a naval base following the Winter War between Finland and the Soviet Union, but was now besieged. Virsaitis took part in the fourth evacuation convoy on 24 November 1941 and the final operation, which left Hanko on the evening of 2 December. Virsaitis struck a mine later that day and sunk.

Wreck site

In 2011, the wreck of Virsaitis was found off the coast of Finland near Hanko.

Notes

References

Bibliography

 
 

1917 ships
Ships built in Rostock
M68
Virsaitis (1917)
T-297